Geoffrey Hunter may refer to:
Geoff Hunter (footballer) (1959–2022), English soccer player
Geoff Hunter (cricketer) (born 1937), English cricketer
Geoffrey Hunter (logician) (1925–2000), British logician

See also
Jeffrey Hunter (disambiguation)